Durham v. United States can refer to: 

 Durham v. United States (1971)
 Durham v. United States (1954)